Bluebeard's Seven Wives is a 1926 American silent comedy film produced and released by First National Pictures. It was directed by Alfred Santell and starred Ben Lyon, Lois Wilson, and Blanche Sweet.

Plot
As described in a film magazine review, John Hart, who works as a teller in a bank, is fired after a shortage is found in his account. He gets a job at a movie studio, where they consider him a "find" and everyone works to make him a star. The publicity department has his name changed to Don Juan Hartez and he is planted on an incoming steamer. As a new screen lover, a press agent scheme is to marry him to seven wives. However, John balks after a few fake marriages and runs off and marries his sweetheart Mary Kelly.

Cast

Preservation
With no prints of Bluebeard's Seven Wives located in any film archives, it is a lost film.

References

External links

Lobby cards and advertising material at dorothysebastian.com

1926 films
1926 comedy films
Silent American comedy films
American silent feature films
American black-and-white films
Lost American films
Films directed by Alfred Santell
First National Pictures films
1926 lost films
Lost comedy films
1920s American films